Egon R. Erickson (July 4, 1888 – January 20, 1973) was an American track and field athlete, a member of the Mott Haven Athletic Club, the Irish American Athletic Club and the New York City Police Department from 1911 until his retirement in 1939. At the time of his retirement, Erickson was attached to the Detective Bureau.

Erickson competed in the 1912 Olympic Games in Stockholm, Sweden, in the high jump, tying with Jim Thorpe for the fourth place. He won the AAU title in 1909 (outdoor) and 1912 (indoor) and finished third in 1913 and 1916.

References

External links
 List of American athletes
 Winged Fist Organization
 Do You Remember - Erickson, early Bronx athlete, article by Bill Twomey in Bronx Times-Reporter, September 16–23, 2016, p. 57

1888 births
1973 deaths
Athletes from Gothenburg
American male high jumpers
Olympic track and field athletes of the United States
Athletes (track and field) at the 1912 Summer Olympics
New York City Police Department officers
Swedish emigrants to the United States
Track and field athletes from New York City